NTV Jata is a Bosnian local commercial television channel based in Srebrenik, Bosnia and Herzegovina. The program is mainly produced in Bosnian language.

External links 
 Official website
Mass media in Srebrenik
Television stations in Bosnia and Herzegovina